The NBC Page Program is a 12-month paid fellowship at the  NBCUniversal's studios in New York City and Universal City, California. Over the course of one year, pages gain exposure to various areas of the NBCUniversal portfolio. Pages contribute to various teams while on business, consumer and content assignments. East Coast pages also give tours and work in audience services at NBC Studios in New York City. Notable people who began their careers as NBC pages include Regis Philbin, Michael Eisner, Ted Koppel, Trevor Moore and Aubrey Plaza.

Background

The Page Program is the longest-running franchise under NBC. NBC began the page program in 1933 at its Rockefeller Center headquarters, later expanding it to the West Coast studios in Universal City. In the 1950s, NBC also offered page positions at their owned-and-operated stations, such as WRC in Washington, D.C. where future Today Show personality Willard Scott was an NBC page.
 
Selection is highly competitive, with only 212 pages selected a year out of more than 16,000 applicants. With around 1.5 percent of applicants accepted to the program, becoming an NBC page is more competitive than gaining admission to Ivy League universities. Past pages describe the interview process as grueling, as the company seeks the best corporate image to present to the public.

Pages regularly get to work on such programs as The Tonight Show and Saturday Night Live. Pages also rotate through assignments in public relations (PR), marketing, development, TV  music services, and production in a variety of shows and special projects. Many pages go on to careers with NBC or other broadcast media, and a number have become celebrities or leaders of the industry in their own right.

In popular culture
In the NBC sitcom 30 Rock, produced by former Saturday Night Live head writer Tina Fey, Jack McBrayer portrays a zealous, smiling, do-good NBC page named Kenneth Parcell, who appears as a page through the show's seven seasons despite pages usually only being employed for a year. And while pages are usually in their 20s, it is a running joke on the show that Kenneth is unrealistically old (indeed, that he is immortal)  based on his looks. (For example, in Season 5's "When it Rains, it Pours", Kenneth is seen nostalgically packing away a signed photograph of Fred Allen from 1947, dedicated: "Kenneth, you're the TOPS!" into a box marked "NBC Memories 1945-1967".)

Notable NBC pages
 
Notable former NBC pages include:
Actress Aubrey Plaza
Weather forecaster Tex Antoine
TV Producer and personality Chuck Barris
Director and producer James W. "Jim" Case
Producer/writer and NYC television host Clay Cole
Former Disney CEO Michael Eisner
Today Show host Dave Garroway
 The View co-host, former NBC's TODAY Show correspondent Sara Haines
Actress Kate Jackson
Television personality Stu Kerr
ABC-TV newsman Ted Koppel
Game show host Bill Leyden
Whitest Kids U Know comedian Trevor Moore 
 Today Show executive producer Don Nash
TV personality Regis Philbin
Match Game host Gene Rayburn
Actress Eva Marie Saint
Today personality Willard Scott
Current TV host Michael Shure
ABC Good Morning America host Lara Spencer
Actor Efrem Zimbalist, Jr.
Media personality and executive assistant to Conan O'Brien, Sona Movsesian
NBC News and MSNBC Correspondent and host of NBC's Stay Tuned, Savannah Sellers
Science fiction author Pierce Brown
Joan Rivers Comedian - https://www.youtube.com/watch?v=LWO68EgsEFU

References

External links
East Coast Page Program
"Tonight Show" page information
 NBC Universal Page Program career information page and quick facts

Mass media occupations
Entertainment occupations
National Broadcasting Company
Mass media in New York City
Universal City, California